Supermarket Fantasy, is the thirteenth (their official website lists it as the 15th) original studio album by Mr. Children it earned commercial success and debuted on the Japanese Oricon Charts at rank 1 on December 10, 2008. It sold 707,763 copies in its first week, the second best-selling debut album sales figure of the 2009 Oricon Year, and is still charting as of August 2009. It has 14 tracks, including smash singles "Tabidachi no Uta," "Gift," "Hanabi", and digital single "Hana no Nioi."  Songs "Shounen" and "Esora" were used to further promote the album but were not included on any singles, and the album includes "Kaze to Hoshi to Mebiusu no Wa," b-side from the "GIFT" single. As of November 25, 2009, Supermarket Fantasy has sold 1,246,962 copies and is currently slated as the second best-selling album of the 2009 Oricon Yearly Chart, The album was shot featured by the couple kissing around the food sections flowing around.

The album generally received favorable reviews by the critics.

Track listing

Yearly Charts
SUPERMARKET FANTASY

HANABI

References 

Mr. Children albums
2008 albums
Japanese-language albums
Albums produced by Takeshi Kobayashi